Calidota obscurata is a moth of the family Erebidae. It was described by Herbert Druce in 1884. It is found in Mexico, Guatemala, Costa Rica and Panama.

References

Phaegopterina
Moths described in 1884